Suraj Kashyap (born 14 August 2003) is an Indian cricketer. He made his Twenty20 debut on 27 January 2021, for Bihar in the quarter-finals of the 2020–21 Syed Mushtaq Ali Trophy. He made his List A debut on 24 February 2021, for Bihar in the 2020–21 Vijay Hazare Trophy.

References

External links
 

2003 births
Living people
Indian cricketers
Bihar cricketers
Place of birth missing (living people)